Fayette City is a borough in Fayette County, Pennsylvania, United States. The population was 502 at the 2020 census, a decline from the figure of 596 tabulated in 2010. It is served by the Belle Vernon Area School District. Some buildings in the town antedate 1820.

Like many towns in this area, Fayette City has been home to many coal miners supporting the coal industry in the region. It was the site of the Naomi Mine explosion, December 7, 1907.  It was also the location of an explosion in the Apollo Mine in January 1926 

Herbert Vargo Jr. is the current mayor.  His term ends in 2025.  He was first elected to the office in 1993.

Geography
Fayette City is located in northwestern Fayette County at  (40.100647, -79.838913). It sits on the east bank of the Monongahela River, which forms the border with Washington County. Pennsylvania Route 201 passes through Fayette City as Main Street (northbound) and Second Street (southbound).

Fayette City's low elevation and location along the Monongahela River make it susceptible to flooding after heavy rains. Lamb Lick Run and Downers Run enter the Monongahela within the borough's boundaries.

Demographics

As of the census of 2000, there were 714 people, 286 households, and 193 families residing in the borough. The population density was 2,769.2 people per square mile (1,060.3/km²). There were 321 housing units at an average density of 1,245.0 per square mile (476.7/km²). The racial makeup of the borough was 99.30% White, 0.14% African American, and 0.56% from two or more races. Hispanic or Latino of any race were 0.14% of the population.

There were 286 households, out of which 33.2% had children under the age of 18 living with them, 45.5% were married couples living together, 15.4% had a female householder with no husband present, and 32.5% were non-families. 30.1% of all households were made up of individuals, and 16.8% had someone living alone who was 65 years of age or older. The average household size was 2.50 and the average family size was 3.11.

In the borough the population was spread out, with 27.3% under the age of 18, 7.7% from 18 to 24, 29.3% from 25 to 44, 20.2% from 45 to 64, and 15.5% who were 65 years of age or older. The median age was 38 years. For every 100 females, there were 88.9 males. For every 100 females age 18 and over, there were 85.4 males.

The median income for a household in the borough was $29,375, and the median income for a family was $38,542. Males had a median income of $35,357 versus $23,250 for females. The per capita income for the borough was $13,058. About 20.2% of families and 26.1% of the population were below the poverty line, including 38.8% of those under age 18 and 17.3% of those age 65 or over.

Notable people
Jim Russell, baseball player.

References

Populated places established in 1806
Pittsburgh metropolitan area
Boroughs in Fayette County, Pennsylvania
Pennsylvania populated places on the Monongahela River
1806 establishments in Pennsylvania
Coal towns in Pennsylvania